The ROX Desktop is a graphical desktop environment for the X Window System. It is based on the ROX-Filer which is a  drag and drop spatial file manager. It is free software released under the GNU General Public License. The environment was inspired by the user interface of RISC OS (not to be confused with RISC/os). The name "ROX" comes from "RISC OS on X". Programs can be installed or removed easily using Zero Install.

The project was started by Thomas Leonard as a student at University of Southampton in 1999 and was still led by him in 2012.

Software components 

The ROX Desktop is a desktop environment based on the ROX-Filer file manager. Files are loaded by applications by using drag and drop from the filer to the application, and saved by dragging back to the filer. Applications are executable directories, and are thus also installed (copied), uninstalled (deleted), and run through the filer interface. ROX has a strong link with Zero Install, a method of identifying and executing programs via a URL, to make software installation completely automatic.

The desktop uses the GTK toolkit, like the GNOME and Xfce desktops. The design focuses on small, simple programs using drag-and-drop to move data between them. For example, a user might load a compressed file into a spreadsheet from the web by dragging the data from the web browser to the archiver, and from there into the spreadsheet. A program would be installed in the same way, by dragging the archive from the web to the archiver, and from there to the applications directory in the filer.

Drag-and-drop saving allows the user to save the text file to any directory they please, or directly to another application, such as the archiver on the panel.

ROX Filer

ROX-Filer is a graphical spatial file manager for the X Window System. It can be used on its own as a file manager, or can be used as part of ROX Desktop. It is the file manager provided by default in certain Linux distributions such as Puppy Linux and Dyne:bolic, and was used in Xubuntu until Thunar became stable.

ROX-Filer is built using the GTK+ toolkit. Available under the terms of the GPL-2.0-or-later license, ROX-Filer is free software.

See also

 Comparison of X Window System desktop environments
 Package manager

References

Notes

 Bruce Byfield (7 February 2007) ROX Desktop provides light, quirky alternative to GNOME and KDE, Linux.com
  Jo Moskalewski (July 2002) ' RISC rocks. Jo´s alternativer Desktop: ROX LinuxUser

External links
 

Desktop environments based on GTK
Discontinued software
Free desktop environments
Free file managers
Free software programmed in C
Free software programmed in Python
Linux windowing system-related software
Science and technology in Hampshire
University of Southampton
RISC OS